James Wellwood Johnston (1900–1958) was a Unionist Member of Parliament (MP) for Clackmannan and Eastern Stirlingshire.

This was normally a Labour seat which he did fairly well to win from the sitting MP, Lauchlin MacNeill Weir, in the National Government landslide of 1931.  However Weir narrowly won it back in 1935.

References

External links 
 

Members of the Parliament of the United Kingdom for Scottish constituencies
1900 births
1958 deaths
UK MPs 1931–1935
Unionist Party (Scotland) MPs